The Sony FE 24-70mm F2.8 GM is a premium constant maximum aperture full-frame (FE) zoom lens for the Sony E-mount, announced by Sony on February 3, 2016.

Though designed for Sony's full frame E-mount cameras, the lens can be used on Sony's APS-C E-mount camera bodies, with an equivalent full-frame field-of-view of 36-105mm.

Build quality

The lens showcases a matte-black weather resistant plastic exterior with a rubber focus and zoom ring. There is also a zoom lock to prevent zoom creep and an Autofocus-Manual focus switch. The barrel of the lens telescopes outward from the main lens body as it's zoomed in from 24mm to 70mm.

See also
List of Sony E-mount lenses
Sony FE 24-70mm F4 ZA OSS

References

Camera lenses introduced in 2016
24-70